The Șoimeni is a right tributary of the river Borșa in Romania. It flows into the Borșa near Vultureni.

References

Rivers of Romania
Rivers of Cluj County